Wilancookite is a very rare and complex beryllium phosphate with the chemical formula . Wilancookite was discovered in pegmatite of the Lavra Ponte do Piauí complex, Jequitinhonha, Minas Gerais, Brazil.

Relation to other minerals
Wilancookite is related to pahasapaite, a lithium-bearing beryllium phosphate mineral.

References

Phosphate minerals
Beryllium minerals
Barium minerals
Cubic minerals
Minerals in space group 197
Minerals described in 2017